FLSA may refer to :

 Fair Labor Standards Act, a federal statute of the United States
 French Language Services Act, a law in the province of Ontario, Canada